Jean-Baptiste Lemoyne (born 15 September 1977) is a French politician of La République En Marche! (LREM) who served as Secretary of State at the Minister for Europe and Foreign Affairs in the governments of successive Prime Ministers Édouard Philippe and Jean Castex from 2019 to 2022.

Political career 
After the presidential and legislative elections of 2007, Lemoyne became deputy chair of the UMP parliamentary group at the National Assembly. He held this position until 2014, under successive chairmen Jean-François Copé (2007-2010) and Christian Jacob (2010-2014).

Political positions 
In 2013, Lemoyne voted against Law 2013-404, French legislation which grants same-sex couples the right to marry and jointly adopt children.

When German Chancellor Angela Merkel called for European Union member states to give European Commissioner for Trade Cecilia Malmström a clear mandate for negotiations with the United States on metal tariffs in 2018, Lemoyne publicly opposed these plans.

References

1977 births
Living people
The Republicans (France) politicians
La République En Marche! politicians
Senators of Yonne
Lycée Lakanal alumni
ESSEC Business School alumni
People from Bourg-la-Reine
Politicians from Île-de-France
Secretaries of State of France